Jena Woodhouse is a Brisbane-based Australian novelist and poet.

Career
Born Jennifer May Spurway, in Rockhampton in 1949, Woodhouse is a graduate of the University of Queensland obtaining a B.A.Hons in Russian language and literature. Later Woodhouse completed an M.A. in creative writing at Queensland University of Technology. AustLit lists 562 published works by Woodhouse that include the domestic fiction ‘Farming Ghosts’ (2009), and the short story collection ‘Dreams of Flight’ (2014).

Woodhouse's published poetry collections include 'Eros in Landscape' (1989), 'Passenger on a Ferry' (1994) and 'Green Dance: Tamborine Mountain Poems' (2018).

Woodhouse's poetry has been recognised both in Australia and internationally. Amongst Woodhouse's awards is a High Commendation for ‘The Termitary’ in the 2007 Fellowship of Australian Writers Tom Collins Poetry Prize (Western Australia) and second place for ‘Galahs near Booranga’ in the 2017 Henry Kendall Poetry Award (Victoria). Woodhouse has been short-listed three times for the Montreal International Poetry Prize for ‘A Bird and the River ‘ (2013), ‘Evening Stroll by the Canal’ (2015), and more recently for ‘Lament for a Daughter’ (2020).

Woodhouse's poems have also been set to music. Woodhouse's poem sequence 'The River’ formed the basis of Betty Beath’s song cycle ‘River Songs’ (1991) for soprano and her poems 'Turquoise Lullaby', ' Every Shadow‘ and 'When Evie Dances’  (2018) forms the text for Beath's song cycle 'Evie Dances’ for mezzo-soprano. Woodhouse's poem 'The She Wolf' is the text of one of five songs in Beath's song cycle ’Points in a Journey’ (1987) for soprano.

Prose
Jena Woodhouse (2009) Farming Ghosts, Port Adelaide: Ginninderra Press.
 Christina Houen and Jena Woodhouse (eds) (2006) Hidden Desires: Australian Women Writing, Ginninderra Press. 
Jena Woodhouse (1993) Metis, The Octopus and the Olive Tree, Nundah: Jam Roll Press.

Poetry
Jena Woodhouse, Larisa Chen (illustrator) (1989) Eros in Landscape  Brisbane: Jacaranda Press. 
Jena Woodhouse (1994) Passenger on a Ferry, St Lucia: University of Queensland Press. 
Jena Woodhouse (2018) Green Dance: Tamborine Mountain Poems Calanthe Press.

External links
Jena Woodhouse | AustLit: Discover Australian Stories
Jena Woodhouse
Jena Woodhouse
1. River Mother, River Child 2. Boy and the River
The She wolf
A Poet in our Midst: Jena Woodhouse | State Library Of Queensland

References

Australian women novelists
1949 births
Living people
21st-century Australian poets